Marina van der Merwe (born February 7, 1937) is a former field hockey coach, who was born in Cape Town, South Africa.

Coaching career
She was the head coach of the Canada women's national field hockey team from 1976 to 1995. During her time as coach, the team qualified for every major international games. Her teams medal-led at the World Cups in 1983 (silver) and in 1986, and bronze at the Pan Am Games in 1987.

van der Merwe coached the York Lions from 1971 to 1999. During this time, the Lions won six silver and two bronze medals in the Canadian Interuniversity Sport competition, and seven Ontario University Athletics championships. Members of her team included 41 all-Canadians, over 55 conference all-stars, and more than 10 national team athletes.

van der Merwe retired from teaching at York University in 2002.

Awards and honours
In addition to the U Sports Field Hockey Coach of the Year award now named in van der Merwe's honour, her contributions to the sport were recognized through multiple awards:

1994, Canadian Interuniversity Sport Field Hockey Coach of the Year award
1999, Canadian Interuniversity Sport Field Hockey Coach of the Year award
2004, York Lions Hall of Fame inductee
 2014, Canada's Sports Hall of Fame inductee

References

External links

Living people
Afrikaner people
South African people of Dutch descent
Canadian field hockey coaches
Sportspeople from Cape Town
South African expatriates in Canada
South African expatriates in the United States
South African field hockey coaches
South African female field hockey players
Syracuse University alumni
York Lions coaches
1937 births